Eternal Treblinka: Our Treatment of Animals and the Holocaust is a non-fiction book by the American author Charles Patterson, first published in December 2001.

Summary

Part I 
In part one of Eternal Treblinka, Patterson opens chapter one by quoting Sigmund Freud. “In the course of his development towards culture man acquired a dominating position over his fellow-creatures in the animal kingdom.” This quote sets the stage for the first chapter which expresses the relationship between humans and animals. Patterson describes how the domination of man over animals is a recent phenomenon. “Mans emergence as the dominant species is a very recent development.”

He brings in Carl Sagan's idea of the Cosmic Calendar to show just how little time humans have actually spent on this earth to begin to portray this idea. He then illustrates the different arguments on what caused the technological advances of the human species beyond that of animals, by presenting the ideas of those ranging from Jared Diamond to Barbara Ehrenreich. Once the proper technological advances of humans were acquired, then came the domestication of animals. Patterson quotes “The transition to herding and farming happened gradually. Those who hunted wild sheep and goats attached themselves to a particular herd, which then became “their” herd to follow and exploit.” Patterson notes that in order to domesticate animals for human purposes such as meat and labor, herders learned how to control the animals whole lives through the use of “castration, hobbling, branding, ear cropping, and such devices as leather aprons, whips, prods, and eventually chains and collars…”

He describes the brutal processes such as castration, and the early weaning of calves from their mothers. He then goes on to divulge the relationship between the exploitation of animals and victims of the Holocaust. “Once animal exploitation was industrialized and accepted as part of the natural order of things, it opened the door to similar ways of treating other human beings, thus paving the way for such atrocities as human slavery and the Holocaust.” 

Patterson also brings up the topic of how the domestication of animals has led to the domination and sexual subjection of women. He quotes Elizabeth Fisher, “The domestication of women followed the initiation of animal keeping.” she writes “and it was then that men began to control women’s reproductive capacity, enforcing chastity and sexual repression.” Fisher wrote this in her book Woman's Creation: Sexual Evolution and the Shaping of Society "Feminist philosopher Elizabeth Fisher (1979) was one of the first authors to discuss the link between domination of women and the domestication of animals." Patterson believes that the keeping of animals set a model for the domination over women and the enslavement of humans in general. 

Patterson writes that slaves were even branded and castrated just as animals still are to this day. “Branding was used as a way to mark and identify slaves throughout the Americas until the late 1700s.” 

Patterson then moves on to the idea of The Great Chain of Being. It was created by Plato, which “Formalized the belief of the Greeks that they ranked higher than non-Greeks, women, slaves, and, of course, animals.” Because of this early hierarchical arrangement, Patterson thinks that this is part of the reason that men look upon themselves as better and more superior than animals. It created a hierarchy of social classes and determined their place in society. According to the human-centric view, animals were made for man, thus creating the human/animal divide. Patterson insists that Descarte and his followers had a large influence in this when they maintained that animals did not feel pain and claimed that their cries, howls, and writhings were only external reflexes, unconnected to inner sensation. Patterson quotes that “Widening the gulf between man and animals to such an extent provided by far the best rationalization yet for the human exploitation of animals.”

In chapter two he uncovers how humans began vilifying others as animals. Since Europeans began describing Native Americans and Africans as animals, it justified slavery to them. Since animals were already looked down upon them as less superior, when they associated Africans with animals it made it easier for them to treat them this horribly. Patterson writes “Calling people animals is always an ominous sign because it sets them up for humiliation, exploitation, and murder.” When the Europeans traveled to Africa in the sixteenth century some described the people there as rude and beastlie; they even referred their language to that of apes because they did not understand. Native Americans were vilified as well, in a similar way as a prelude to their destruction. “Stannard writes that in California, as elsewhere, whites described indians “as ugly, filthy, and inhuman ‘beasts,’ ‘swine,’ ‘dogs,’ ‘wolves,’ ‘snakes,’ ‘pigs,’ ‘baboons,’ ‘gorillas,’ and ‘oran-gutans,’ to cite only a few of the press's more commonly published characterizations.” Even Japanese were vilified as animals during World War II. They were seen as animals, reptiles, and insects. Patterson quotes John Dowers words from his book War Without Mercy. "Japanese were perceived as animals, reptiles, or insects (monkeys, baboons, gorillas, dogs, mice and rats, vipers and rattlesnakes, cockroaches, vermin..” After Pearl Harbor, Japanese-Americans were literally treated like animals. They were rounded up and forced to live in animal facilities.

Lastly, Patterson brings up the topic of the vilification of Jews.  “In Germany this kind of vilification began long before the Nazis came to power. At first, the leader of the Protestant Reformation, Martin Luther (1483-1546) praised Jews for rejecting the corrupt teachings of the papal “antichrist.” But when it soon became clear the Jews weren't all that eager to convert to his brand of Christianity, he denounced them as “pigs” and “mad dogs.”" Patterson then begins to discuss the topic of the Holocaust and how Jews were viewed during this time. He quotes one of the leading members of the Nazi party on his views of Jews. “Heinrich Himmler, who regarded the Jew as “spiritually and mentally much lower than any animal,” saw the war as a racial struggle to the death against the horde of “Asiatic animals” under the control of Jewish Bolshevism.””

Jews were viewed as animals by members of the Nazi party. Viewing Jews as animals made it easier for Nazis to do their job. It made them feel less connected to them emotionally and physically. “The use of animal terms to vilify and dehumanize the victims, combined with the abominably degraded conditions in the camps, made it easier for the SS to do their job, since treating prisoners like animals made them begin to look and smell like animals.” Since civilization was built on the murder and exploitation of animals, it was easier to kill the lower and more degraded human victims. The commandant of Auschwitz is quoted, describing the extermination camp as a “human slaughterhouse”.

Part II 
In part two of Eternal Treblinka, Patterson draws direct connections to the industrialization of animal slaughter and the Holocaust Patterson cites German Jewish philosopher, Theodor Adorno, who he claims said “Auschwitz begins wherever someone looks at a slaughterhouse and thinks: they’re only animals.” However, this quote is apocryphal, and there is no evidence Adorno said those words.

Patterson then delves into the foundations of the industrialized factory farms that began with Western expansion. Patterson says “the European settlers brought with them to the Americas their practices of exploiting animals for labor, food, clothing, and transportation.” He says the slaughter of animals in North America arrived with the English. To describe this phenomenon he discusses the famine facing the Jamestown settlers in the winter of 1607-8 where they slaughtered and ate all the animals they brought from England. After the livestock supply was replenished they butchered the surplus at the start of each winter, and soon the settlers of Jamestown were continuing the slaughter and meat preservation process in bulk. The industrialization of slaughter continued with the colony of New Amsterdam, which became New York in 1664; by 1665 the number of butchered animals a year was almost 10,000 and the colony required slaughter permits. As the amount of slaughter increased, the slaughterhouses kept moving “in deference to the public, wanting to be spared the sights, sounds, and smells of slaughter” Patterson notes that the first step toward the division of labor that would transform the American meat industry was evident in Cincinnati by the mid 1800s when larger plants combined their slaughter and meatpacking operations.

According to Patterson, by the 1850s the construction of Union Stock Yards turned meatpacking into a major industry and Chicago became the slaughter capital of America The Meatpacking industry also introduced the conveyor belt, increasing the efficiency and speed of the nation's first mass-production industry with the assembly line process In 1905, after the meat industry lobby blocked a bill in Congress that would’ve implemented meat inspection standards, the paper The Appeal To Reason enlisted Upton Sinclair to investigate the Chicago meatpacking industry. Sinclair published fictional novel The Jungle based on what he saw while investigating, which exposed the horrors of the meatpacking industry to the public.

Patterson says that the biggest difference between the slaughter of animals today and in the early 1900s is that slaughterhouses have become faster and increased in volume of production, “[a slaughterhouse] today... kills more animals in a single day than all the slaughterhouses in Sinclair's day killed in a year.” Patterson then discusses political artist, Sue Coe's, book Dead Meat about her six years visiting slaughterhouses around the country. In her book Coe says that the Holocaust kept coming to mind as she visited the slaughterhouses, “she says she wonders if [the Holocaust] is ‘the comforting measuring rod by which all horrors are evaluated?’” Patterson continues his argument of relating the industrialization of the meat industry to the Holocaust by discussing Henry Ford, “whose impact on the twentieth century began, metaphorically speaking, at an American slaughterhouse and ended at Auschwitz.” 

In his autobiography, Ford said that his inspiration for assembly-line production came from visiting a Chicago slaughterhouse. Patterson states that not only did Ford help the Holocaust happen by developing the assembly-line method that the Germans used for killing, but he also launched an anti-Semitic campaign. Hitler praised Ford; he even said “I regard Henry Ford as my inspiration."

According to Patterson, Ford was not the only American influence on the Holocaust, the eugenics movement and Mendel's theory of heredity had an impact, as well. In addition to eugenics, sterilization in America influenced German atrocities. Patterson claims that “Nazi Germany looked to the United States for racial leadership” because Hitler was impressed by America's laws on sterilization, racial segregation and immigration restrictions. Patterson continues by describing how the Nazi's compared mentally challenged people to animals in order to justify and practice research on sterilization and eugenics on them.

Patterson then discusses Heinrich Himmler, attributing Himmler's experience operating on a chicken farm to his prior familiarity with mass killing; “Himmler didn’t consider his victims human, so he was not at all concerned about their suffering or their fate." By 1942, Himmler's work led to a running Auschwitz for the mass extermination of all “sub-humans."

Patterson's final relation between animal slaughter and the Holocaust culminates in his last chapter. He states, “the study of human history reveals the pattern: first humans exploit and slaughter animals; then, they treat other people like animals and do the same to them." It was not only in the murdering that the Nazis dehumanized their victims, but in their treatment before it as well; they were naked and crowded together in herds. Similar to the process of animals in a slaughterhouse, those who arrived to concentration camps sick were shot for efficiency. 

Patterson says that “children were shown no mercy at death camps either,” although their cries were known to have deeper psychological impact on the perpetrators, similar to slaughterhouse workers forced to kill baby animals. The Nazis created a hierarchy in which “sub-humans,” such as minorities, were ranked below animals and thusly treated that way. Patterson ends by mentioning a little girl in a Warsaw ghetto that said, “I would like to be a dog because the Germans like dogs, and I would not have to be afraid they would kill me."

Key terms in Eternal Treblinka 
1. Treblinka: The name of a Nazi death camp during the World War II era, where an estimated 800,000 Jews were killed. Treblinka and the Holocaust are related to the human treatment of animals.

2. Human Megalomania: The self-declared ownership humans gave themselves over other occupants of the world, such as animals. This idea is the basis for chapter one, and breaks down human supremacy over other inhabitants on earth. Synonym: "Human Arrogance".

3. Amar-kud: Sumerian term for castrated slave boys, donkeys, oxen, and horses. That the ancient Mesopotamian city-states used the same term for these indicates that they treated their slaves and livestock in the same manner.

4. Emasculation: The act of weakening or depriving a man of his identity as a male. It was used in the book to describe how American colonists treated black slave men, for example, by castrating them. They castrated male slaves the same way they castrated bulls. This exemplifies how white men exerted their self-declared power over black men, by treating them as they did animals.

5. Homo Ferus: "A wild man who was four-footed, mute and hairy." The term was coined by Carolus Linnaeus to characterize non-whites as being half human and half animal.

6. Great Chain of Being: A concept originating from Plato that places organisms in a hierarchy with Greeks at the top, followed by non-Greeks, women, and then slaves and animals.

7. Subhuman: Being lesser than human. This is referred to often in reference to treatment of prisoners during the Holocaust.

8. Craniometry: The scientific measurement of brain sizes. This was used as a way to rank humans based on brain size in order to portray specific foreign people as lesser.

9. Extermination: The killing of an entire group, usually in reference to animals or insects, but used by the Nazis to refer to people.

10. Foramen Magnum: The hole located in the base of one's skull where the spinal cord passes through. Research on the location of the foramen magnum, done by a French pathologist, determined black people's skulls resembled those of monkeys in order to place them as lesser than white people.

Reception 
Political Affairs called Eternal Treblinka, "a wonderful book about terrible subjects". JVNA called it "very well researched ... written with great sensitivity and compassion".

Editions 
Eternal Treblinka has been translated into French, German, Spanish, Italian, Hebrew, Polish, Czech, Serbian, Croatian, Slovenian, Russian, and Japanese, and Korean.

See also 
 Animal–industrial complex
 Holocaust analogy in animal rights

References 

2001 non-fiction books
Books about animal rights
Books about the Holocaust